Goat Hill—also called Bellvue Dome—is a dome in Larimer County, Colorado near Bellvue.

The dome has a gradual slope on its east side, but its west side is an almost-vertical cliff that hangs over the Cache la Poudre River that passes directly below. The mountain was formed as sedimentary rock was uplifted and folded during the Laramide orogeny.

Access
The mountain itself is on property owned by the Bureau of Land Management, but it's surrounded by private land, so access is difficult or impossible without permission from the adjacent property owners.

Goat Hill is prominently seen by motorists driving south on Highway 287. One can see the mountain in profile, with the slope on the left and the cliff on the right, before the highway turns east towards Fort Collins.

References

Geologic domes
Mountains of Larimer County, Colorado
North American 1000 m summits